Mermoz - which is originally a family name from central-East France - may refer to:

People 
Jean Mermoz, 1901–1936, a French aviator
Maxime Mermoz, a French professional rugby union footballer

Science 
MERMOZ, a method of remotely detecting living matter

Transport 
USS Muskegon (PF-24), a Tacoma-class frigate later commissioned in the French Navy as Mermoz (F-14) 
Serenade, a cruise ship originally named Jean Mermoz

Other 
Lycée Français Jean-Mermoz, a school in Buenos Aires, Argentina
Mermoz-Sacré-Cœur, a neighbourhood of Dakar, the capital city of Senegal
Jean Mermoz, a comic book by Jean-Michel Charlier

Franco-Provençal-language surnames